Allen Jones (December 24, 1739 – November 10, 1798) was an American planter, American Revolution brigadier general of the Halifax District Brigade, and statesman from Edgecombe County, North Carolina.

Early life
Allen Jones was born in Edgecombe County, North Carolina (later Halifax County), in the Province of North Carolina. He attended Eton College in England.

Profession
After returning to the colony, he was a member of the Province of North Carolina House of Burgesses between 1773 and 1775 and delegate to the five North Carolina Provincial Congresses (1774-1776), serving as vice-president in the Fourth Provincial Congress.

Jones served in the military throughout the American Revolutionary War (1775–83).
Colonel over the Northampton County Regiment of Militia (1775-1776)
Brigadier General over the Halifax District Brigade of North Carolina militia (1776-1783)

He also served in the State senate 1777 to 1779, 1783, 1784, and 1787; and as a Member of the Continental Congress in 1779 and 1780. Jones was a delegate at the state convention that rejected the proposed Constitution of the United States at Halifax, in 1788.

He was the older brother of Congressman Willie (pronounced Wylie) Jones, a leader in neighboring Halifax County. Together they were the source of the Jones surname adopted by the Scottish American naval hero during the Revolutionary War, John Paul Jones — whose birth-surname was Paul. Allen Jones was also the father-in-law of North Carolina Governor and Constitutional Convention delegate William Richardson Davie.

Death
Allen Jones died on his plantation, Mount Gallant, near Roanoke Rapids, Northampton County, North Carolina, on November 10, 1798. Interment was in the private burial ground on his estate.

References

External links
Biographic sketch at U.S. Congress website

1739 births
1798 deaths
Continental Congressmen from North Carolina
18th-century American politicians
People educated at Eton College
North Carolina militiamen in the American Revolution
Militia generals in the American Revolution
Members of the North Carolina Provincial Congresses
Members of the North Carolina House of Burgesses